Ira M. Longini (born October 2, 1948) is an American biostatistician and infectious disease epidemiologist.

Early life and education
Longini was born in Cincinnati, Ohio. He received his Ph.D. in Biometry and Biomathematics at the University of Minnesota in 1977.  He also received a MS in Statistics/Operations Research in 1973 and a BS, Engineering/Operations Research, from the University of Florida in 1971.

Career
Longini began his career with the International Center for Medical Research and Training and the Universidad del Valle in Cali, Colombia, where he worked on tropical infectious disease problems and taught courses in biomathematics. Following that he was a professor of biostatistics at the University of Michigan, Emory University, and the University of Washington. In 2014 he is a professor of biostatistics at the University of Florida and Co-Director of the Center for Statistical and Quantitative Infectious Diseases (CSQUID), the Emerging Pathogens Institute, at the University of Florida.

Research 
Longini studies stochastic processes applied to epidemiological problems. He has specialized in the mathematical and statistical theory of epidemics, which involves constructing and analyzing mathematical models of disease transmission, disease progression and the analysis of infectious disease data based on these models.  He designs and analyses vaccine and infectious disease prevention trials and observational studies.  He has worked on the analysis of epidemics of influenza, HIV, tuberculosis, cholera, dengue fever, malaria, rhinovirus, rotavirus, measles and other infectious agents.

Longini is also collaborating with the Department of Health and Human Services, the World Health Organization, the CDC and other public health organizations on mathematical and statistical models for the control of a possible bioterrorist attack with an infectious agent such as smallpox, and other natural infectious disease threats such as pandemic influenza or another SARS-like infectious agent.

Longini develops mathematical statistical methods to estimate the transmission and natural history of infectious diseases.  These methods are then used to create mathematical models which predict infectious disease transmission and indicate methods for control with vaccines and other measures.  His work on HIV helped to develop an understanding of pathogenesis and progression of HIV, including how HIV is transmitted in different rates at different stages.  This work contributed to the design HIV treatments and analysis of their effectiveness.  Longini extensively studied the transmission and of pandemic and interpandemic influenza and its control with antiviral agents and vaccines.

Longini investigated how infectious diseases such as influenza, cholera, typhoid and dengue could be controlled with vaccines.  He has designed, analyzed and interpreted vaccine studies for many of these infectious diseases, taking into account the indirect protection that unvaccinated people receive in a population of vaccinated people.  His work has helped to demonstrate how mass vaccination of school children helps to protect the entire community from influenza.  This strategy is being implemented throughout the world, and could eventually lead to control of both pandemic and interpandemic influenza.

Honors 
Longini has won a number of awards for excellence in research, including the Howard M. Temin Award in Epidemiology for “Scientific Excellence in the Fight against HIV/AIDS,” two CDC Statistical Science Awards for both “Best Theoretical and Applied Papers,” and the CDC James H. Nakano Citation "for an outstanding scientific publications."   He is a Fellow of the American Statistical Association and a Fellow of the American Association for the Advancement of Science.

Selected publications 
Longini is author or coauthor of more than 152 scientific papers and one book.

 Longini, I.M., Ackerman, E. and Elveback, L.R.: An optimization model for influenza A epidemics. Mathematical Biosciences 38,141‑157 (1978).
 Longini, I.M. and Koopman, J.S.: Household and community transmission parameters from final distributions of infections in households. Biometrics 38, 115‑126 (1982).
 Longini, I.M., Koopman, J., Monto, A.S. and Fox, J.P.: Estimating household and community transmission parameters for influenza. American Journal of Epidemiology 115, 736‑751 (1982).
 Rvachev, L.A. and Longini, I.M.: A mathematical model for the global spread of influenza. Mathematical Biosciences, 75:3 22 (1985)
 Horsburgh, C.R., Ou, C.H., Jason, J., Holmberg, S.D., Longini, I.M., et al.: Duration of human immunodeficiency virus infection before detection of antibody. Lancet II, 637‑640 (1989).
 Longini, I.M., Clark, W.S., Byers, R.H., Lemp, G.F., Ward, J.W., Darrow, W.W., and Hethcote, H.W.: Statistical analysis of the stages of HIV infection using a Markov model. Statistics in Medicine 8, 831 843 (1989).
 Longini, I.M.: Modeling the decline of CD+4 T‑lymphocyte counts in HIV‑infected individuals. Letter to the Editor. Journal of Acquired Immune Deficiency Syndromes 9, 930‑931 (1990).
 Jacquez, J.A., Koopman, J.S., Simon, C.P. and Longini, I.M.: The role of primary infection in the epidemics of HIV infection in gay cohorts. Journal of Acquired Immune Deficiency Syndromes 7, 1169‑1184 (1994).
 Longini, I.M. and Halloran, M.E.: AIDS: Modeling epidemic control. Science 267, 1250 ‑1251 (1995).
 Longini, I.M. and Halloran, M.E. A frailty mixture model for estimating vaccine efficacy. Applied Statistics 45, 165-173 (1996).
 Longini, I.M., Yunus, M., Zaman, K., Siddique, A.K., Sack, R.B. and Nizam, A.: Epidemic and endemic cholera trends over thirty‑three years in Bangladesh. Journal of Infectious Diseases 186, 246-251 (2002).
 Longini, I.M., Halloran, M.E. Nizam A. and Yang, Y.: Containing pandemic influenza with antiviral agents. American Journal of Epidemiology 159, 623-633 (2004). 
 Longini, I.M., Nizam, A., Xu, S., Ungchusak, K., Hanshaoworakul, W., Cummings, D., Halloran, M.E.: Containing pandemic influenza at the source. Science 309, 1083–1087 (2005). 
 Longini, I.M. and Halloran, M.E.: Preparing for the worst‑case scenario: RE: Containing pandemic influenza at the source, Science 310, 1117‑1118 (2005). 
 Halloran, M.E. and Longini, I.M.: Community studies for vaccinating school children against influenza. Science 311, 615-616 (2006). 
 Germann, T.C., Kadau, K., Longini I.M. and Macken C.A.: Mitigation strategies for pandemic influenza in the United States. Proceedings of the National Academy of Sciences 103, 5935-5940 (2006). 
 Longini, I.M., Nizam, A.,  Ali, M., Yunus, M., Shenvi, N. and Clemens, J.D.:  Controlling endemic cholera with oral vaccines.  Public Library of Science (PloS), Medicine 4 (11) 2007: e336 . 
 Halloran, M.E., Ferguson, N.M., Eubank, S., Longini, I.M., et al. :  Modeling targeted layered containment of an influenza pandemic in the United States.  Proceedings of the National Academy of Sciences 105, 4639-4644 (2008). 
 Halloran, M.E., Longini, I.M. and Struchiner, C.J.: The Design and Analysis of Vaccine Studies. Springer, New York, 387 pp. (2009).
 Yang, Y., Sugimoto, JD, Halloran, M.E., Basta, NE, Chao, DL, Matrajt, L, Potter, G, Kenah, E, Longini, IM:  The transmissibility and control of pandemic influenza A (H1N1) virus. Science 326, 729-33 (2009). 
 Chao, D.L., Halloran, M.E., Longini, I.M.:  Vaccination strategies for epidemic cholera in Haiti with implications for the developing world. Proceedings of the National Academy of Sciences 108, 7081-85 (2011). 
 Chao, D.L., Halstead, S.B., Halloran, M.E., Longini, I.M.:  Controlling dengue with vaccines in Thailand. PLoS Negl Trop Dis 6(10): e1876.  (2012).

References

External links
 
 Profile at washington.edu
 Profile at University of Florida
 Profile at CSQUID

1948 births
Living people
21st-century American biologists
Biostatisticians
University of Minnesota College of Science and Engineering alumni
University of Florida College of Engineering alumni
University of Florida faculty
Fellows of the American Association for the Advancement of Science
Fellows of the American Statistical Association
University of Michigan faculty